Stanley Tang (born 1992) is a Hong Kong billionaire tech entrepreneur. He is best known as the co-founder and Chief Product Officer at DoorDash, which he started along with Tony Xu, Andy Fang and Evan Moore in 2013.

DoorDash had its IPO in December 2020 making Tang's net worth an estimated $2.2 billion as of December 2020.

Personal life
Tang has a bachelor's degree in Computer Science from Stanford University. He grew up in Hong Kong and now resides in San Francisco, California.

References 

1992 births
Living people